Elvet is an area of the city of Durham, in County Durham, in England. It is situated on the opposite side of the River Wear from Durham Cathedral and forms the south-eastern part of central Durham. Elvet is currently unparished.  Historically, the word elvet means "swan" or "swan-stream", from the Old English elfetu or ilfetu. The Swan and Three Cygnets, a public house on Elvet Bridge, is a reminder of the historical name given to this part of the city.

Elvet grew up from two medieval settlements based around Old Elvet and St Oswald's Church and includes Church Street, Hallgarth Street, Whinney Hill and much of Durham University's science site and the Roman Catholic chaplaincy at St Cuthbert's Church. Elvet is home to Durham Prison and Durham Crown Court centre (Court Lane), County Court centre (New Elvet) and magistrates' court (Old Elvet). The Crown Court centre was originally built for the Durham Assizes and is a grade II* listed building.

Hallgarth Street
Elvet House, a former Crown building (c. 1951) in Hallgarth Street, is currently the base for Durham's Jobcentre Plus, Crown Prosecution Service, Driving Standards Agency and Tribunals Service. The County Court vacated its purpose-built 1960's annex to Elvet House in October 2008 to relocate alongside the magistrates' court.

Old Elvet
Shire Hall, a grade II listed building, is located on Old Elvet. 
Ustinov College operates three student residences (houses 29, 34 and 38) on Old Elvet; The Swan is unnumbered but located immediately beside 38.

The local Masonic Lodge (Universities Lodge 2352) is at 36. The Masonic Hall was built in 1869. The architect was T C Ebdy.

The Royal County Hotel is a grade II listed building. It has a staircase that was taken from Loch Leven Castle.
Number 32, which has been used as an Adult Education Centre, is a grade II listed building.

Elvet Methodist Church was begun in 1902.

Number 34 is a grade II listed building. It has been used as the Graduate Society Offices. Elizabeth Milbanke and John Bacchus Dykes lived there at different times.

The Dun Cow, a pub which is number 37, is a grade II listed building.

Numbers 1, 5, 6, 14, 15, 15A, 17, 18, 19, 19½, 20, 25, 26, 26A, 27, 28, 30, 38, 39, 40, 42, 43, 44, 45, 46, 52, 53, 54, 55 and 55A are grade II listed buildings. Numbers are 47, 48 and 49 are grade II* listed buildings.

Whinney Hill
Whinney Hill is a street on a hill of the same name in the Elvet area, that name being derived from the whin (gorse) shrub that grows there in profusion. The street runs north–south from Durham Prison and the Durham City Cricket Grounds, on the banks of the River Wear, to the roundabout on the Stockton-on-Tees road near the Durham University science site. The lower site of Durham Johnston Comprehensive School was located on it until September 2009 when the school's sites merged.

Durham's third passenger railway station, Durham Elvet, opened in 1893 at the north end of Whinney Hill, closing in 1954. Its site is now occupied by Durham Magistrates' Court and the university's Parsons Field buildings.

References
Margot Johnson. "Elvet" in Durham: Historic and University City and surrounding area. Sixth Edition. Turnstone Ventures. 1992. . Pages 16 to 18.
Keith Proud. "Heart of the City". Northern Echo. 20 May 2011.
Francis Frederick Johnson. Historic Staircases in Durham City. City of Durham Trust. Durham. 1970.

Areas of Durham, England